Cullman may refer to:

 , an attack transport ship that served in the US Navy during World War II
 Cullman, Alabama, a city
 Cullman County, Alabama, a county
 List of Registered Historic Places in Cullman County, Alabama
 Cullman High School, largest high school  in Cullman, Alabama
 Birmingham-Hoover-Cullman Combined Statistical Area, an area known as Greater Birmingham

See also
Cullmann, a surname